Guilherme de Aguiar Camacho (born 2 March 1990), sometimes known as just Camacho, is a Brazilian footballer who plays as a midfielder for Santos.

Club career

Flamengo
Born in Rio de Janeiro, Camacho joined Flamengo's youth setup at the age of nine, from Madureira. In August 2008, he was loaned to Série B side Paraná until the end of the year, as a part of the deal which saw Éverton move in the opposite direction permanently.

Camacho made his professional debut on 11 October 2008, coming on as a substitute for Giuliano in a 1–1 away draw against Juventude. After three further appearances, he returned to Fla for the 2009 campaign.

Camacho made his first team debut with Flamengo on 15 July 2009, replacing Zé Roberto late into a 1–2 home loss against Palmeiras for the Série A championship. He scored his first goal for the club the following 4 April, netting his team's third in a 3–0 away win against Friburguense.

On 24 September 2010, after being rarely used, Camacho was loaned to Goiás until December. On 31 December, he was announced at Bahia also in a temporary deal.

After featuring regularly for Bahia, Camacho was called back to Flamengo for the 2012 pre-season, but was again rarely used by the club. In 2013, he represented Audax Rio on loan, before playing for Grêmio Osasco Audax in the 2014 campaign.

Audax
After leaving Flamengo, Camacho subsequently had a short period at Guaratinguetá before signing permanently with Audax for the 2015 campaign. He was a regular starter in the 2015 Campeonato Paulista, and joined Botafogo on 4 May of that year, on loan until December.

Camacho helped Bota to achieve promotion to the top tier as champions with 17 appearances, and returned to Audax for the 2016 Paulistão. In the latter competition, he was an undisputed starter as Audax reached the Finals for the first time ever.

Corinthians

On 23 May 2016, Camacho signed a three-year contract with Corinthians. He made his debut for the club on 17 June, in a 0–1 loss against Fluminense, and scored his first goal on 16 November by netting the opener in a 1–1 draw at Figueirense.

Camacho was a part of the squad which won the 2017 Paulista, the 2017 Série A and 2018 Paulista, but was mainly used as a substitute. On 24 February 2018, he moved to Atlético Paranaense on loan until the end of the year, with Sidcley moving in the opposite direction.

Camacho's loan with Athletico was renewed for a further year on 4 January 2019, but saw his playing time being reduced during the campaign. He confirmed his return to Corinthians for the 2020 season on 10 December.

On 4 February 2020, Camacho renewed his contract with Timão until December 2022. On 14 June of the following year, he terminated his contract with the club.

Santos
On 15 June 2021, Camacho signed a contract with Santos until December 2022. He made his debut for the club two days later, replacing Danilo Boza in a 0–1 away loss against Fluminense.

On 22 September 2022, Camacho renewed with Peixe until 2023. He scored his first goal for the club on 17 October, netting the opener in a 2–0 away win over Red Bull Bragantino.

Career statistics

Honours

Club
Flamengo
Campeonato Brasileiro Série A: 2009

Botafogo
Campeonato Brasileiro Série B: 2015

Corinthians
Campeonato Brasileiro Série A: 2017
Campeonato Paulista: 2017, 2018

Athletico Paranaense
Copa Sudamericana: 2018

Individual
Campeonato Paulista Team of the year: 2016

References

External links

1990 births
Living people
Footballers from Rio de Janeiro (city)
Brazilian footballers
Association football midfielders
Campeonato Brasileiro Série A players
Campeonato Brasileiro Série B players
Campeonato Brasileiro Série C players
CR Flamengo footballers
Paraná Clube players
Goiás Esporte Clube players
Esporte Clube Bahia players
Audax Rio de Janeiro Esporte Clube players
Guaratinguetá Futebol players
Grêmio Osasco Audax Esporte Clube players
Botafogo de Futebol e Regatas players
Sport Club Corinthians Paulista players
Club Athletico Paranaense players
Santos FC players